The Evolution of Cooperation is a 1984 book written by political scientist Robert Axelrod that expands upon a paper of the same name written by Axelrod and evolutionary biologist W.D. Hamilton. The book details a theory on the emergence of cooperation between individuals, drawing from game theory and evolutionary biology. Since 2006, reprints of the book have included a foreword by Richard Dawkins and have been marketed as a revised edition. 

The book provides an investigation into how cooperation can emerge and persist (also known as cooperation theory) as explained by the application of game theory. The book provides a detailed explanation of the evolution of cooperation, beyond traditional game theory. Academic literature regarding forms of cooperation that are not easily explained in traditional game theory, especially when considering evolutionary biology, largely took its modern form as a result of Axelrod's and Hamilton's influential 1981 paper and the subsequent book.

Cooperation theory

Operations research 

The idea that human behavior can be usefully analyzed mathematically gained credibility following the application of operations research in World War II to improve military operations.  One famous example involved how the Royal Air Force hunted submarines in the Bay of Biscay.
It had seemed to make sense to patrol the areas where submarines were most frequently seen.  Then it was pointed out that "seeing the most submarines" depended not only on the number of submarines present but also on the number of eyes looking; i.e., patrol density. Making an allowance for patrol density showed that patrols were more efficient – that is, found more submarines per patrol – in other areas. Making appropriate adjustments increased the effectiveness.

Game theory

Accounts of the success of operations research during the war, publication in 1944 of John von Neumann and Oskar Morgenstern's Theory of Games and Economic Behavior  on the use of game theory for developing and analyzing optimal strategies for military and other uses. Additionally the publication of John William's The Compleat Strategist, a popular exposition of game theory, led to a greater appreciation of mathematical analysis of human behavior.

Prisoner's dilemma 
See main page: Prisoner's dilemma

The prisoner's dilemma (invented around 1950 by Merrill M. Flood and Melvin Dresher) is a two person scenario. One version of this involves two criminals who have been caught and imprisoned. The evidence to imprison the criminals for more than a year is insufficient. Both prisoners are presented with the option to remain silent, or confess, which effectively betrays the other prisoner, and both prisoners cannot communicate to form a strategy.

If both prisoners remain silent, both will be imprisoned for one year. If one remains silent and the other betrays, the silent prisoner gets a five-year sentence while the other goes free. If both betray each other, both prisoners get a three-year sentence.

While both prisoners cooperating with each other results in both getting a fairly light sentence, the outcome for a prisoner who cooperates with a prisoner who betrays is worse than the outcome from both prisoners betraying each other, and the benefit from betraying a silent prisoner results in the best case scenario for the one who betrays. When applying this to evolution, where individuals in a species have to all use common resources, it would seem logical to assume that individuals that are selfish would do better resulting in lack of cooperation in modern species. Despite this, cooperation and mutualism have arisen between many species. Explaining how this is the case has been a vexatious problem in evolutionary studies.

Darwinian context 

Charles Darwin's theory of how evolution works ("By Means of Natural Selection") is explicitly competitive ("survival of the fittest"), Malthusian ("struggle for existence"), and even gladiatorial ("nature, red in tooth and claw").  Species are pitted against species for shared resources, similar species with similar needs and niches even more so, and individuals within species most of all. All this comes down to one factor: out-competing all rivals and predators in producing progeny.

Darwin's explanation of how preferential survival of the slightest benefits can lead to advanced forms is the most important explanatory principle in biology, and extremely powerful in many other fields. Such success has reinforced notions that life is in all respects a war of each against all, where every individual has to look out for himself, that your gain is my loss.

In such a struggle for existence altruism (voluntarily yielding a benefit to a non-relative) and even cooperation (working with another for a mutual benefit) seem so antithetical to self-interest as to be the very kind of behavior that should be selected against. Yet cooperation and seemingly even altruism have evolved and persist, including even interspecific cooperation, and naturalists have been hard pressed to explain why.

Social Darwinism 

The popularity of the evolution of cooperation – the reason it is not an obscure technical issue of interest to only a small number of specialists – is in part because it mirrors a larger issue where the realms of political philosophy, ethics, and biology intersect: the ancient issue of individual interests versus group interests.  On one hand, the so-called "Social Darwinians" (roughly, those who would use the "survival of the fittest" of Darwinian evolution to justify the cutthroat competitiveness of laissez-faire capitalism)
declaim that the world is an inherently competitive "dog eat dog" jungle, where every individual has to look out for himself. The writer Ayn Rand damned "altruism" and declared selfishness a virtue.
The Social Darwinists' view is derived from Charles Darwin's interpretation of evolution by natural selection, which is explicitly competitive ("survival of the fittest"), Malthusian ("struggle for existence"), and even gladiatorial ("red in tooth and claw"), and permeated by the Victorian laissez-faire ethos of Darwin and his disciples (such as T. H. Huxley and Herbert Spencer).  What they read into the theory was then read out by Social Darwinians as scientific justification for their social and economic views (such as poverty being a natural condition and social reform unnatural meddling).

Such views of evolution, competition, and the survival of the fittest are explicit in the ethos of modern capitalism, as epitomized by industrialist Andrew Carnegie in The Gospel of Wealth:
[W]hile the law [of competition] may sometimes be hard for the individual, it is best for the race, because it ensures the survival of the fittest in every department.  We accept and welcome, therefore, as conditions to which we must accommodate ourselves, great inequality of environment; the concentration of business, industrial and commercial, in the hands of the few; and the law of competition between these, as being not only beneficial but essential to the future progress of the race.

While the validity of extrapolating moral and political views from science is questionable, the significance of such views in modern society is undoubted.

The social contract and morality 

On the other hand, other philosophers have long observed that cooperation in the form of a "social contract" is necessary for human society but saw no way of attaining that short of coercive authority.

As Thomas Hobbes wrote in Leviathan:
[T]here must be some coercive power to compel men equally to the performance of their covenants by the terror of some punishment greater than the benefit they expect by the breach of their covenant... 
  [C]ovenants without the sword are but words... 

And Jean-Jacques Rousseau in The Social Contract:

[The social contract] can arise only where several persons come together: but, as the force and liberty of each man are the chief instruments of his self-preservation, how can he pledge them without harming his own interests, and neglecting the care he owes himself? 
  In order then that the social contract may not be an empty formula, it tacitly includes the undertaking, which alone can give force to the rest, that whoever refuses to obey the general will shall be compelled to do so by the whole body.  This means nothing less than that he will be forced to be free...  

Even Herman Melville, in Moby-Dick, has the cannibal harpooner Queequeg explain why he has saved the life of someone who had been jeering him as so:

"It's a mutual, joint-stock world, in all meridians.  We cannibals must help these Christians." 

The original role of government is to provide the coercive power to enforce the social contract (and in commercial societies, contracts and covenants generally). Where government does not exist or cannot reach it is often deemed the role of religion to promote prosocial and moral behavior, but this tends to depend on threats of hell-fire (what Hobbes called "the terror of some power"); such inducements seem more mystical than rational, and philosophers have been hard-pressed to explain why self-interest should yield to morality, why there should be any duty to be "good".

Yet, cooperation and even altruism and morality are prevalent even in the absence of coercion, and even though it seems that a properly self-regarding individual should reject all such social strictures and limitations. As early as 1890, the Russian naturalist Petr Kropotkin observed that the species that survived were the ones where individuals cooperated, and that "mutual aid" (cooperation) was found at all levels of existence. By the 1960s biologists and zoologists were noting many instances in the real "jungle" where real animals and even microbes (see microbial cooperation)  – presumably unfettered by conscience and not corrupted by altruistic liberals –  were cooperating.

Darwin's theory of natural selection is a profoundly powerful explanation of how evolution works; its undoubted success strongly suggests an inherently antagonistic relationship between unrelated individuals.  Yet cooperation is prevalent, seems beneficial, and even seems to be essential to human society.  Explaining this seeming contradiction, and accommodating cooperation, and even altruism, within the Darwinian theory is a central issue in the theory of cooperation.

Modern developments 

Darwin's explanation of how evolution works is quite simple, but the implications of how it might explain complex phenomena are not at all obvious; it has taken over a century to elaborate (see modern synthesis). Explaining how altruism – which by definition reduces personal fitness – can arise by natural selection is a particular problem and the central theoretical problem of sociobiology.

A possible explanation of altruism is provided by the theory of group selection (first suggested by Darwin himself while grappling with the issue of social insects), which argues that natural selection can act on groups: groups that are more successful – for any reason, including learned behaviors – will benefit the individuals of the group, even if they are not related.  It has had a powerful appeal but has not been fully persuasive, in part because of difficulties regarding cheaters that participate in the group without contributing.

Another explanation is provided by the genetic kinship theory of William D. Hamilton: if a gene causes an individual to help other individuals that carry copies of that gene, then the gene has a net benefit even with the sacrifice of a few individuals.  The classic example is the social insects, where the workers – which are sterile, and therefore incapable of passing on their genes – benefit the queen, who is essentially passing on copies of "their" genes.  This is further elaborated in the "selfish gene" theory of Richard Dawkins, that the unit of evolution is not the individual organism, but the gene. (As stated by Wilson: "the organism is only DNA's way of making more DNA.") However, kinship selection works only where the individuals involved are closely related; it fails to explain the presence of altruism and cooperation between unrelated individuals, particularly across species.

In a 1971 paper, Robert Trivers demonstrated how reciprocal altruism can evolve between unrelated individuals, even between individuals of entirely different species. And the relationship of the individuals involved is exactly analogous to the situation in a certain form of the Prisoner's Dilemma. The key is that in the iterated Prisoner's Dilemma, or IPD, both parties can benefit from the exchange of many seemingly altruistic acts.  As Trivers says, it "take[s] the altruism out of altruism." The Randian premise that self-interest is paramount is largely unchallenged but turned on its head by recognition of a broader, more profound view of what constitutes self-interest.

It does not matter why the individuals cooperate. The individuals may be prompted to the exchange of "altruistic" acts by entirely different genes, or no genes in particular, but both individuals (and their genomes) can benefit simply on the basis of a shared exchange.  In particular, "the benefits of human altruism are to be seen as coming directly from reciprocity – not indirectly through non-altruistic group benefits".

Trivers' theory is very powerful.  Not only can it replace group selection, but it also predicts various observed behavior, including moralistic aggression, gratitude and sympathy, guilt and reparative altruism, and the development of abilities to detect and discriminate against subtle cheaters.

The benefits of such reciprocal altruism were dramatically demonstrated by a pair of tournaments held by Robert Axelrod around 1980.

Axelrod's tournaments 

Axelrod initially solicited strategies from other game theorists to compete in the first tournament.  Each strategy was paired with each other strategy for 200 iterations of a Prisoner's Dilemma game and scored on the total points accumulated through the tournament.  The winner was a very simple strategy submitted by Anatol Rapoport called "TIT FOR TAT" (TFT) that cooperates on the first move, and subsequently echoes (reciprocates) what the other player did on the previous move.  The results of the first tournament were analyzed and published, and a second tournament was held to see if anyone could find a better strategy.  TIT FOR TAT won again.  Axelrod analyzed the results and made some interesting discoveries about the nature of cooperation, which he describes in his book

In both actual tournaments and various replays, the best-performing strategies were nice: that is, they were never the first to defect.  Many of the competitors went to great lengths to gain an advantage over the "nice" (and usually simpler) strategies, but to no avail:  tricky strategies fighting for a few points generally could not do as well as nice strategies working together. TFT (and other "nice" strategies generally) "won, not by doing better than the other player, but by eliciting cooperation [and] by promoting the mutual interest rather than by exploiting the other's weakness."

Being "nice" can be beneficial, but it can also lead to being suckered.  To obtain the benefit – or avoid exploitation – it is necessary to be provocable and forgiving.  When the other player defects, a nice strategy must immediately be provoked into retaliatory defection. The same goes for forgiveness: return to cooperation as soon as the other player does.  Overdoing the punishment risks escalation, and can lead to an "unending echo of alternating defections" that depresses the scores of both players.

Most of the games that game theory had heretofore investigated are "zero-sum" – that is, the total rewards are fixed, and a player does well only at the expense of other players.  But real life is not zero-sum. Our best prospects are usually in cooperative efforts.  In fact, TFT cannot score higher than its partner; at best it can only do "as good as".  Yet it won the tournaments by consistently scoring a strong second-place with a variety of partners. Axelrod summarizes this as don't be envious; in other words, don't strive for a payoff greater than the other player's.

In any IPD game, there is a certain maximum score each player can get by always cooperating.  But some strategies try to find ways of getting a little more with an occasional defection (exploitation).  This can work against some strategies that are less provocable or more forgiving than TIT FOR TAT, but generally, they do poorly.  "A common problem with these rules is that they used complex methods of making inferences about the other player [strategy] – and these inferences were wrong." Against TFT one can do no better than to simply cooperating. Axelrod calls this clarity.  Or: don't be too clever.

The success of any strategy depends on the nature of the particular strategies it encounters, which depends on the composition of the overall population.  To better model the effects of reproductive success Axelrod also did an "ecological" tournament, where the prevalence of each type of strategy in each round was determined by that strategy's success in the previous round.  The competition in each round becomes stronger as weaker performers are reduced and eliminated.  The results were amazing: a handful of strategies – all "nice" – came to dominate the field. In a sea of non-nice strategies the "nice" strategies – provided they were also provable – did well enough with each other to offset the occasional exploitation. As cooperation became general the non-provable strategies were exploited and eventually eliminated, whereupon the exploitive (non-cooperating) strategies were out-performed by the cooperative strategies.

In summary, success in an evolutionary "game" correlated with the following characteristics:

 Be nice:  cooperate, never be the first to defect.
 Be provocable: return defection for defection, cooperation for cooperation.
 Don't be envious: focus on maximizing your own 'score', as opposed to ensuring your score is higher than your 'partner's'.
 Don't be too clever: or, don't try to be tricky. Clarity is essential for others to cooperate with you.

Foundation of reciprocal cooperation 

The lessons described above apply in environments that support cooperation, but whether cooperation is supported at all depends crucially on the probability (called ω [omega]) that the players will meet again, also called the discount parameter or, poetically, the shadow of the future. When ω is low – that is, the players have a negligible chance of meeting again – each interaction is effectively a single-shot Prisoner's Dilemma game, and one might as well defect in all cases (a strategy called "ALL D"), because even if one cooperates there is no way to keep the other player from exploiting that. But in the iterated PD the value of repeated cooperative interactions can become greater than the benefit/risk of single exploitation (which is all that a strategy like TFT will tolerate).

Curiously, rationality and deliberate choice are not necessary, nor trust nor even consciousness, as long as there is a pattern that benefits both players (e.g., increases fitness), and some probability of future interaction. Often the initial mutual cooperation is not even intentional, but having "discovered" a beneficial pattern both parties respond to it by continuing the conditions that maintain it.

This implies two requirements for the players, aside from whatever strategy they may adopt. First, they must be able to recognize other players, to avoid exploitation by cheaters. Second, they must be able to track their previous history with any given player, in order to be responsive to that player's strategy.

Even when the discount parameter ω is high enough to permit reciprocal cooperation there is still a question of whether and how cooperation might start. One of Axelrod's findings is that when the existing population never offers cooperation nor reciprocates it – the case of ALL D – then no nice strategy can get established by isolated individuals; cooperation is strictly a sucker bet. (The "futility of isolated revolt".) But another finding of great significance is that clusters of nice strategies can get established. Even a small group of individuals with nice strategies with infrequent interactions can yet do so well on those interactions to make up for the low level of exploitation from non-nice strategies.

Cooperation becomes more complicated, however, as soon as more realistic models are assumed 
that for instance offer more than two choices of action, 
provide the possibility of gradual cooperation, 
make actions constrain future actions (path dependence),
or in which 
interpret the associate's actions are is non-trivial (e.g. recognizing the degree 
of cooperation shown)

Subsequent work 

In 1984 Axelrod estimated that there were "hundreds of articles on the Prisoner's Dilemma cited in Psychological Abstracts", and estimated that citations to The Evolution of Cooperation alone were "growing at the rate of over 300 per year".
To fully review this literature is infeasible.  What follows are therefore only a few selected highlights.

Axelrod has a subsequent book, The Complexity of Cooperation,
which he considers a sequel to The Evolution of Cooperation.  Other work on the evolution of cooperation has expanded to cover prosocial behavior generally,
and in religion,

other mechanisms for generating cooperation,
the IPD under different conditions and assumptions,
and the use of other games such as the Public Goods and Ultimatum games to explore deep-seated notions of fairness and fair play.
It has also been used to challenge the rational and self-regarding "economic man" model of economics,
and as a basis for replacing Darwinian sexual selection theory with a theory of social selection.

Nice strategies are better able to invade if they have social structures or other means of increasing their interactions.  Axelrod discusses this in chapter 8; in a later paper he and Rick Riolo and Michael Cohen use computer simulations to show cooperation rising among agents who have negligible chance of future encounters but can recognize similarity of an arbitrary characteristic (such as a green beard). Whereas other studies have shown that the only Iterated Prisoner's Dilemma strategies that resist invasion in a well-mixed evolving population are generous strategies.

When an IPD tournament introduces noise (errors or misunderstandings) TFT strategies can get trapped into a long string of retaliatory defections, thereby depressing their score.  TFT also tolerates "ALL C" (always cooperate) strategies, which then give an opening to exploiters.
In 1992 Martin Nowak and Karl Sigmund demonstrated a strategy called Pavlov (or "win–stay, lose–shift") that does better in these circumstances.
Pavlov looks at its own prior move as well as the other player's move.  If the payoff was R or P (see "Prisoner's Dilemma", above) it cooperates; if S or T it defects.

In a 2006 paper Nowak listed five mechanisms by which natural selection can lead to cooperation.
In addition to kin selection and direct reciprocity, he shows that:

 Indirect reciprocity is based on knowing the other player's reputation, which is the player's history with other players. Cooperation depends on a reliable history being projected from past partners to future partners.
 Network reciprocity relies on geographical or social factors to increase the interactions with nearer neighbors; it is essentially a virtual group.
 Group selection assumes that groups with cooperators (even altruists) will be more successful as a whole, and this will tend to benefit all members.

The payoffs in the Prisoner's Dilemma game are fixed, but in real life defectors are often punished by cooperators.  Where punishment is costly there is a second-order dilemma amongst cooperators between those who pay the cost of enforcement and those who do not.
Other work has shown that while individuals given a choice between joining a group that punishes free-riders and one that does not initially prefer the sanction-free group, yet after several rounds they will join the sanctioning group, seeing that sanctions secure a better payoff.

In small populations or groups there is the possibility that indirect reciprocity (reputation) can interact with direct reciprocity (e.g. tit for tat) with neither strategy dominating the other. The interactions between these strategies can give rise to dynamic social networks which exhibit some of the properties observed in empirical networks If network structure and choices in the Prisoner's dilemma co-evolve, then cooperation can survive. In the resulting networks cooperators will be more centrally located than defectors who will tend to be in the periphery of the network.

In "The Coevolution of Parochial Altruism and War" by Jung-Kyoo Choi and Samuel Bowles. From their summary:

Altruism—benefiting fellow group members at a cost to oneself —and parochialism—hostility towards individuals not of one's own ethnic, racial, or other group—are common human behaviors.  The intersection of the two—which we term "parochial altruism"—is puzzling from an evolutionary perspective because altruistic or parochial behavior reduces one's payoffs by comparison to what one would gain from eschewing these behaviors.  But parochial altruism could have evolved if parochialism promoted intergroup hostilities and the combination of altruism and parochialism contributed to success in these conflicts....  [Neither] would have been viable singly, but by promoting group conflict they could have evolved jointly.

They do not claim that humans have actually evolved in this way, but that computer simulations show how war could be promoted by the interaction of these behaviors. A crucial open research question, thus, is how realistic the assumptions are which these simulation models are based on.

Summary and current understanding 

When Richard Dawkins set out to "examine the biology of selfishness and altruism" in The Selfish Gene, he reinterpreted the basis of evolution, and therefore of altruism. He was "not advocating a morality based on evolution", and even felt that "we must teach our children altruism, for we cannot expect it to be part of their biological nature." But John Maynard Smith was showing that behavior could be subject to evolution, Robert Trivers had shown that reciprocal altruism is strongly favored by natural selection to lead to complex systems of altruistic behavior (supporting Kropotkin's argument that cooperation is as much a factor of evolution as competition), and Axelrod's dramatic results showed that in a very simple game the conditions for survival (be "nice", be provocable, promote the mutual interest) seem to be the essence of morality. While this does not yet amount to a science of morality, the game theoretic approach has clarified the conditions required for the evolution and persistence of cooperation, and shown how Darwinian natural selection can lead to complex behavior, including notions of morality, fairness, and justice. It is shown that the nature of self-interest is more profound than previously considered, and that behavior that seems altruistic may, in a broader view, be individually beneficial. Extensions of this work to morality and the social contract may yet resolve the old issue of individual interests versus group interests.

Software 

Several software packages have been created to run prisoner's dilemma simulations and tournaments, some of which have available source code.

 The source code for the second tournament run by Robert Axelrod (written by Axelrod and many contributors in Fortran) is available online
 PRISON, a library written in Java, last updated in 1999
 Axelrod-Python, written in Python

Recommended reading

See also 

 Co-operation (evolution)

References

Bibliography 
Most of these references are to the scientific literature, to establish the authority of various points in the article.  A few references of lesser authority, but greater accessibility are also included.

External links
 The Iterated Prisoner's Dilemma and The Evolution of Cooperation
 The Evolution of Trust

1984 non-fiction books
Books about evolutionary psychology
Books about game theory
Holism
Basic Books books